The 1914 Arkansas gubernatorial election was held on September 14, 1914.

Incumbent Democratic Governor George Washington Hays won re-election to a second term, defeating Republican nominee Andrew L. Kinney and Socialist nominee Dan Hogan with 69.47% of the vote.

Democratic primary

The Democratic primary election was held on March 25, 1914. Hays was unopposed for the nomination.

General election

Candidates
George Washington Hays, Democratic
Andrew L. Kinney, Republican
Dan Hogan, Socialist, candidate for Governor in 1906 and 1910

Results

References

Bibliography
 
 

1914
Arkansas
Gubernatorial